Shurabad or Shuraabad or Suraabad or Shoor Abad may refer to:

Armenia
Paghakn

Azerbaijan
Şuraabad, Agdam
Şuraabad, Khizi
Şuraabad, Nakhchivan

Iran

Fars Province
Shurabad, Fars, a village in Fasa County

Kerman Province
Shurabad, Kerman
Shurabad, Fahraj, Kerman Province
Shurabad-e Mehrab Khan, Fahraj County, Kerman Province
Shurabad, Jiroft, Kerman Province
Shurabad, Narmashir, Kerman Province

Kermanshah Province
Shurabad, Kermanshah, a village in Kermanshah County
Shurabad, Sonqor, a village in Sonqor County

Lorestan Province
Shurabad, Lorestan
Shurabad, Aligudarz, Lorestan Province

Sistan and Baluchestan Province
Shurabad, Khash, a village in Khash County

South Khorasan Province
Shurabad, South Khorasan
Shurabad, Birjand, South Khorasan Province

West Azerbaijan Province
Shurabad, West Azerbaijan, a village in Mahabad County

See also
Sarvabad